The 2015–16 Bradley Braves women's basketball team represents Bradley University during the 2015–16 NCAA Division I women's basketball season. The Braves are led by fourth year head coach Michael Brooks. The Braves are members of the Missouri Valley Conference and play their home games at Renaissance Coliseum. They finished the season 9–22, 4–14 in MVC play to finish in ninth place. They advanced to the quarterfinals of the Missouri Valley women's tournament where they lost to Northern Iowa.

On March 14, Michael Brooks was fired. He finished at Bradley with a four year record 37–84.

Roster

Schedule

|-
! colspan="9" style="background:#a50000; color:#fff;"|  Exhibition

|-
! colspan="9" style="background:#a50000; color:#fff;"|  Non-conference regular season

|-
! colspan="12" style="background:#a50000; color:#fff;"| Missouri Valley Conference regular season

|-
! colspan="9" style="background:#a50000; color:#fff;"| Missouri Valley Women's Tournament

See also
2015–16 Bradley Braves men's basketball team

References

Bradley Braves women's basketball seasons
Bradley
Bradley
Bradley